Imbricaria salisburyi is a species of sea snail, a marine gastropod mollusk, in the family Mitridae, the miters or miter snails.

Description
The length of the shell varies between 14 mm and 21 mm.

Distribution
This marine species occurs off Réunion and the Philippines

References

 Drivas J. & Jay M. (1990). Descriptions of new mollusks from Réunion Island -II. Cerithidae, Lamellariidae, Buccinidae, Mitridae, and Veneridae. Venus. 49(4): 271–279.

salisburyi
Gastropods described in 1990